Ukaruchan Arena is an arena in Otsu, Shiga, Japan. It is the home arena of the Shiga Lakestars of the B.League, Japan's professional basketball league.

Facilities
Main building - 1,890m2（45m×42m）
Annex - 858m2（33m×26m）
Sports square
Running course - 180m
Conference room

References

Basketball venues in Japan
Indoor arenas in Japan
Shiga Lakes
Sports venues in Shiga Prefecture
Buildings and structures in Ōtsu
Sports venues completed in 1973
1973 establishments in Japan